Iker Gabarain González (born 21 May 1977) is a Spanish retired footballer who played as a left back.Nowadays he works in Ederfil Becker.

External links
 
 Futbolme profile  
 

1977 births
Living people
People from Tolosa, Spain
Spanish footballers
Footballers from the Basque Country (autonomous community)
Association football defenders
Segunda División players
Segunda División B players
Tercera División players
Deportivo Alavés B players
Real Unión footballers
Tolosa CF footballers
SD Beasain footballers